Vizion Air is a virtual charter airline based in at Antwerp International Airport in Antwerp, Belgium.

Fleet

References

Airlines of Belgium
Airlines established in 2013
Charter airlines
Companies based in Antwerp